Yong Pil Rhee (December 10, 1932 – March 23, 2004) was a Korean political scientist, systems scientist and professor and chairman of the board of trustees at the Seoul National University, South Korea. He was one of the first systems theorists, who demonstrated that the system is dynamic and experiences change.

Biography 
Yong Pil Rhee received a B.A. from Yonsei University in 1957, and a M.A. in 1959.  He was a professor at  Konkuk University however decided to continue his education abroad. In 1968 he received a M.A. from Northwestern University, and in 1974 a PhD. from the University of Chicago under David Easton with the thesis "Breakdown of Authority Structure in Korea in 1960: A Systems Approach", a case study of the failure of concerted feedback. 

He became professor at the Seoul National University later in 1979. In the mid-1990s Rhee also worked for the International Systems Institute. 

Yong Pil Rhee was the president of the Korean Society for Systems Science Research, and the president of the International Society for the Systems Sciences in 1996, and the president of the International Federation for Systems Research (IFSR) from 1998  until 2000 and the president of IFSR from 2000 until 2002. He was a member of the editorial board of the journal Systems Research and Behavioral Science, and of the International Advisory Board of the "Systems Thinking: Four-Volume Set": a systems science reference for all libraries of business, management and organization studies.

Publications 
Rhee wrote several books, articles and papers. A selection:
 1982. Breakdown of Authority Structure in Korea in 1960: A Systems Approach . Univ of Hawaii.  
 1996. Complex systems model of South-North Korean integration. Edited. Seoul : Seoul National University Press. 
 1997. Systems Thinking, Globalization of Knowledge, and Communitarian Ethics. Edited with Kenneth D. Bailey. Proceedings of the International Society for the Systems Sciences International Conference. Seoul, Korea.
 1998. Complexity of Korean Unification Process: System Approach. Seoul: Seoul National University Press, 
 1999. Dynamics and Complexity of Political System. Seoul, Korea:. Ingansarang Press.
 2003. Chaos and order through fluctuations in global capitalism in the twenty-first century (Abstract)

References

External links 
 GLOBAL CRISIS IN THE 21ST CENTURY Yong Pil Rhee,  President of the IFSR 1998. 
 Axel Randrup with  a picture of Yong Pil Rhee. 
 CHAOS AND ORDER THROUGH FLUCTUATIONS IN GLOBAL CAPITALISM IN THE 21ST CENTURY (abstract)

1933 births
2004 deaths
Northwestern University alumni
Academic staff of Seoul National University
South Korean social scientists
Systems scientists
University of Chicago alumni
Yonsei University alumni
20th-century South Korean scientists
21st-century South Korean scientists
Presidents of the International Society for the Systems Sciences